The Caballerizo mayor (Great Equerry) was the Officer of the Royal Household and Heritage of the Crown of Spain in charge of the trips, the mews and the hunt of the King of Spain.

Regime during the 16th to 18th centuries

The Office of “Caballerizo mayor” was one of the main Offices of the Royal Household in charge of the Royal Stables and everything related to the transportation of the Monarch. When the King sorted out from the Royal Palace, the Caballerizo had the main position behind him and the major rang over the other Court Officials. He managed as well the stables, the carriages and the horses. He was assisted by the “Primeros Caballerizos” (First Equerries) who were nominated by him.

He was in charge of the Royal hunt as “Montero mayor” (Great Hunter) holding, in many cases, the “Alcaldias” (Majorships) of the Spanish royal sites.

Regime during the 19th and 20th centuries 

During the reigns of the last two Kings before the proclamation of the Second Spanish Republic, Alfonso XII and Alfonso XIII, the “Caballerizo”, which joined to his function that of the “Montero mayor” (Great Hunter) of the King (which was an Office created during the reign of Isabella II), was the second person in category after the Mayordomo mayor having the sole authority so soon the Monarch left the Royal Palace. Only a peer that had the rank of Grandee of Spain could be nominated for this Office. His annual wages were 15.000 pesetas, the same ones that had the “Mayordomo” and, equally, he had the right to a private office at the Royal Palace of Madrid.

Under his command they were the "Primer Caballerizo" (First Equerry) and the "Primer Montero" (First Hunter) with wages, both, of 7.500 pesetas per year. Under them they were situated the "Caballerizos de campo" (Equerries), who, usually, were officers of the Army.

The “Caballerizo” accompanied the King in all his trips or, as it was called, "days" and sat close to him in every carriage, in car or in the trips by train or by ship throughout Spain or foreign countries.

The “Caballerizo mayor”, with assistance of the First Caballerizo, was the chief of the Royal Mews.  Also,  he was the chief of the Armory of the Royal Palace of Madrid.

As “Montero mayor”, with the help of the First Montero, he managed the hunting lodges of the Heritage of the Crown and organized the hunts attended by the King on the hunting-grounds of the Crown as the Royal forests of El Pardo, the Royal Hunting Lodge of la Encomienda de Mudela or the Royal forests of Valsaín. In the hunts organized by others, and attended also by the King, the “Montero mayor” was always accompanying him in that condition.

As “Montero mayor” equally, his uniform was of green very dark cloth with own embroideries in form of branches of oak.

In the Public Chapels and official ceremonies he normally stood right behind the Mayordomo mayor.

He was styled “Excelentísimo señor Caballerizo y Montero mayor de Su Majestad”.

This Office was suppressed after the proclamation of the Second Spanish Republic in 1931 and never re-created after the restoration of the Monarchy in 1975.

List of “Caballerizos mayores” (Great Equerries) to the King of Spain between 1515 and 1931

“Caballerizos mayores” to the Emperor Charles V, 1515-1556 

 1515-1522: Charles de Lannoy, Grandee of Spain
 1522-1526: Cesare Ferramosca
 1526-1529: Adrien de Croy, Count of Roeulx
 1529-1530: Guillermo de Monfort, Lord of Montfort
 1530-1556: Jehan Lenin-Liéthard, Count of Bossu, Grandee of Spain
 1556: Sieur de Dandelot

“Caballerizos mayores” to the King Philip II, 1556-1598 

 1556-1579: Antonio de Toledo
 1598: Diego Fernández de Córdoba, Lord of Armuña

“Caballerizos mayores” to the King Philip III, 1598-1621 

 1598-1618: Francisco de Sandoval y Rojas, Duke of Lerma, Grandee of Spain
 1618-1621: Cristóbal Gómez de Sandoval y de la Cerda, Duke of Uceda, Grandee of Spain

“Caballerizos mayores” to the King Philip IV, 1621-1665 

 1621-1624: Juan Hurtado de Mendoza, Duke of the Infantado, Grandee of Spain
 1624-1643: Gaspar de Guzmán, Count-Duke of Olivares, Grandee of Spain
 1643-1648: Diego López de Haro Sotomayor y Guzmán, Marquess of Carpio, Grandee of Spain
 1648-1661: Luis Méndez de Haro, Marquess of Carpio, Grandee of Spain
 1661-1665: Fernando de Borja, Prince of Squillace and Count of Mayalde, Grandee of Spain

“Caballerizos mayores” to the King Charles II, 1665-1701 

 1667-1669: Pedro Portocarrero de Córdoba y Aragón, Duke of Camiña, Grandee of Spain
 1669-1675: Francisco de Moura Corte-Real y Melo, Marquess of Castel-Rodrigo, Grandee of Spain
 1675-1683: Juan Gaspar Enríquez de Cabrera y Sandoval, Duke of Medina de Rioseco, Admiral of Castile, Grandee of Spain
 1683-1687: Juan Francisco de la Cerda, Duke of Medinaceli, Grandee of Spain
 1687-1688: Francisco Fernández de Córdoba, Duke of Sessa, Grandee of Spain
 1693-1701: Juan Tomás Enriquez de Cabrera, Duke of Medina de Rioseco, Admiral of Castile, Grandee of Spain

“Caballerizos mayores” to the King Philip V, 1701-1724 

 1701-1713: Juan Clarós Pérez de Guzmán y Fernández de Córdoba, Duke of Medina Sidonia, Grandee of Spain
 1715-1721: Francesco Maria Pico, Duke of la Mirandola, Grandee of Spain
 1721-1724: Alonso Manrique de Lara, Duke of Arco, Grandee of Spain

“Caballerizo mayor” to the King Louis I, 1724 

 1724: Alonso Manrique de Lara, Duke of Arco, Grandee of Spain

“Caballerizos mayores” to the King Philip V, 1724-1746 

 1724: Alonso Manrique de Lara, Duke of Arco, Grandee of Spain
 1737-1746: Manuel de Benavides y Aragón, Duke of Santisteban del Puerto, Grandee of Spain

“Caballerizos mayores” to the King Ferdinand VI, 1746-1759 

 1746-1749: Francisco VI Fernández de la Cueva y de la Cerda, Duke of Alburquerque, Grandee of Spain
 1749-1759: Luis Fernández de Córdoba y Spínola, Duke of Medinaceli, Grandee of Spain

“Caballerizos mayores” to the King Charles III, 1759-1788 

 1759-1768:  Luis Fernández de Córdoba y Spínola, Duke of Medinaceli, Grandee of Spain
 1768-1777: Pedro de Alcántara Pérez de Guzmán y Pacheco, Duke of Medina Sidonia, Grandee of Spain
 1780-1788: Felipe  López Pacheco de la Cueva, Marquess of Villena, Grandee of Spain

“Caballerizos mayores” to the King Charles IV, 1788-1808 

 1788-1798: Felipe  López Pacheco de la Cueva, Marquess of Villena, Grandee of Spain
 1798-1801: Juan de la Cruz Belbis de Moncada y Pizarro, Marquess of Bélgida
 1801-1808: Vicente Joaquín Osorio de Moscoso y Guzmán, Marquess of Astorga, Grandee of Spain

“Caballerizos mayores” to the King Ferdinand VII, 1808 and 1814-1808 

 1808: Vicente Joaquín Osorio de Moscoso y Guzmán, Marquess of Astorga, Grandee of Spain
 1814-1822: Juan de la Cruz Belbis de Moncada y Pizarro, Marquess of Bélgida
 1822-1823: Vicente Isabel Osorio de Moscoso y Álvarez de Toledo, Marquess of Astorga, Grandee of Spain
 1823-1833: Juan de la Cruz Belbis de Moncada y Pizarro, Marquess of Bélgida

“Caballerizos mayores” to the Queen Isabella II, 1833-1868 

 1833-1838: Fernando de Aguilera y Contreras, Marquess of Cerralbo, Grandee of Spain
 1838-1839: Ángel María de Carvajal y Fernández de Córdoba y Gonzaga, Duke of Abrantes, Grandee of Spain
 1839-1854: Joaquín Fernández de Córdoba Pacheco, Duke of  Arión, Grandee of Spain
 1854: Mariano Patricio de Guillamas y Galiano, Marquess of San Felices, Grandee of Spain
 1854-1856: Vicente Pío Osorio de Moscoso y Ponce de León, Duke of Montemar, Grandee of Spain
 1856-1859: Francisco Javier Arias Dávila y Matheu, Count of Puñonrostro, Grandee of Spain
 1860-1868: Fernando Díaz de Mendoza y Valcárcel, Count of Lalaing, Grandee of Spain

“Caballerizo mayor” to the King  Amadeo I, 1871-1873

 1871: Carlos O'Donnell, Duke of Tetuan, Grandee of Spain (1)

“Caballerizo mayor” to the King  Alfonso XII, 1875-1885

 1875-1885: José Isidro Osorio y Silva-Bazán, Marquess of Alcañices, Grandee of Spain

“Caballerizos mayores” to the King Alfonso XIII, 1885-1931

 1885-1900: José Joaquín Álvarez de Toledo y Silva, Duke of Medina Sidonia, Grandee of Spain (1)
 1903-1906: Manuel Felipe Falcó y Ossorio, Marquess of la Mina, Grandee of Spain
 1906-1927: José de Saavedra y Salamanca, Marquess of Viana, Grandee of Spain
 1927-1931: Baltasar de Losada y Torres, Count of Maceda, Grandee of Spain

(1) From 1871 to 1873 this Office was suppressed. From 1900 to 1903 it remained vacant

List of “Primeros Caballerizos” (First Equerries) to the King of Spain between 1875 and 1931

“Primeros Caballerizos” to  King Alfonso XII, 1875-1885 

 1875-1876: Ricardo Castellví e Ibarrola, Count of Carlet
 1876-1885: Ignacio de Arteaga y Puente, Count of el Pilar

“Primeros Caballerizos” to  King Alfonso XIII, 1885-1931 

 1885-1894: Ignacio de Arteaga y Puente, Count of el Pilar
 1894-1903: Bernardo Ulibarri
 1903-1912: Rodrigo Álvarez de Toledo
 1912-1914: Fernando Moreno de Tejada y Díaz de Cabria, Count of Fuenteblanca
 1914-1931: Miguel Tacón y Calderón, Duke of la Unión de Cuba, Grandee of Spain

List of "Primeros Monteros" (First Hunters) to the King of Spain between 1875 and 1931

“Primer Montero” to  King Alfonso XII, 1875-1885 

 1875-1885: Honorio de Samaniego y Pando, Count of Villapaterna

“Primeros Monteros” to  King Alfonso XIII, 1885-1931 

 1885-1893: Honorio de Samaniego y Pando, Count of Villapaterna
 1903-1927: Baltasar de Losada y Torres, Count of Maceda
 1927-1931: Alonso Alvarez de Toledo y Samaniego, Marquess of Valdueza

See also
Mayordomo mayor
Gentilhombres de cámara con ejercicio
Gentilhombres Grandes de España con ejercicio y servidumbre

Bibliography 

 Enciclopedia universal ilustrada europeo-americana. Volume 49. Hijos de J. Espasa, Editores.1923
 Martínez Millán José. Universidad Autónoma de Madrid. Departamento de Historia Moderna. La Corte de Carlos V. 2000
 Martinéz Millán (dir). José. La Corte de Felipe II. Madrid. Alianza 1994
 Martínez Millán, José  y Visceglia, Maria Antonietta (Dirs.). La Monarquía de Felipe III. Madrid, Fundación Mapfre, 2008/2009
 Archivo General de Palacio (AGP) . Patrimonio Nacional. Sección Personal

Royal households
Spanish monarchy
Spanish courtiers